The 2021 Grambling State Tigers football team represented Grambling State University in the 2021 NCAA Division I FCS football season. The Tigers were led by eighth-year head coach Broderick Fobbs for the first ten games before he was fired on November 15, with linebackers coach and special teams coordinator Terrence Graves being named interim head 
coach. They played their home games at Eddie Robinson Stadium in Grambling, Louisiana as members of the West Division of the Southwestern Athletic Conference (SWAC).

Previous season

The Tigers finished the 2020–21 season with 0–4 overall record and 0–4 in SWAC play to finish last place in the West Division.

Schedule

Game summaries

vs. Tennessee State

at Southern Miss

at. Houston

vs. Prairie View A&M

vs. Alabama A&M

at. Alcorn State

vs. Texas Southern
, Homecoming Game

at. Florida A&M

at Arkansas–Pine Bluff

vs Bethune–Cookman

vs. Southern

References

Grambling State
Grambling State Tigers football seasons
Grambling State Tigers football